The ZBD-03 or Type 03 (industrial designation WZ506) is a Chinese airborne infantry fighting vehicle. It features a light-weight chassis and hydropneumatic suspension for airborne operations. Early prototypes received the designation ZLC-2000.

Development
The ZBD-03 was designed to replace the BMD-3 and was in service as part of the People's Liberation Army Air Force. The vehicle was designed to be air-dropped from medium-sized aircraft such as the Xi'an Y-20 if necessary. Available variants include the infantry fighting vehicle (IFV), armored recovery vehicle (ARV), and anti-tank guided missiles (ATGMs).

Design

The ZBD-03 features indigenously designed chassis and internal subsystems, which possess a distinctive layout different from Russian designs. However, some part of the vehicle might contain Russian technologies used on BMD-3.

Mobility
The vehicle can be airdropped from Y-20 transport aircraft. The vehicle also retains the Russian parachute system for airdrop operations from the Il-76. ZBD-03's relatively narrow width allows the vehicle to be transported by a Y-8 tactical transport aircraft.

The suspension system of ZBD-03 consists of five lightweight road wheels and three return rollers with a front-mounted drive sprocket. The integrated hydropneumatic suspension has variable ground clearance. Tracks are retracted before airdropping, thus minimizing the force of impact during the landing operation. The ZBD-03 is fully amphibious. The vehicle is propelled by its tracks in the water.

The vehicle is powered by a Dongfeng diesel engine, developing 210 hp or 350 hp. The maximum road speed is 72 km/h, while the maximum speed on water is 6 km/h.

Armament
The ZBD-03 is equipped with a single-man turret with a dual-axis stabilized ZPT-99A 30mm autocannon capable of firing high-explosive incendiary (HEI), high explosive tracer (HE-T), armor-piercing (AP), and armour-piercing discarding sabot (APDS) ammunition. A missile rail launcher at the top of the turret is included as part of the HJ-73C anti-tank guided missile (ATGM) system. HJ-73C is a type of SACLOS guided missile capable of engaging armored vehicles, stationary bunkers, and helicopters. The vehicle has a total of four rounds of HJ-73 available. Secondary weaponry includes a coaxial 7.62mm machine gun and three smoke grenade dischargers mounted to each side of the turret.

Fire control
The ZBD-03 features a computerized fire control system. The gunner has access to day/night thermal optics, laser rangefinder, and digital ballistic computer. The driver and commander have their own observation instruments installed on the hatch. Although the autocannon on the ZBD-03 is stabilized, the gunner thermal sight lacks stabilization, thus limiting the accuracy while moving. The mid-life upgrade of ZBD-03 that was unveiled in 2021 features a new fire control system with the capability of firing on the move. The new stabilized thermal optics and electro-optical sensors are mounted at the base of the autocannon. The thermal images are connected to the internal displays attended by the gunner and commander.

Protection
The ZBD-03 has a crew of three (a commander, a driver, and a gunner) and can carry five infantry passengers in a troop compartment. The gunner is seated in the single-man turret located in the middle of the chassis. The driver and commander are located in tandem to the left of the power compartment in the front right of the chassis. The troop compartment is located in the rear with two overhead hatches and a rear exit.

The ZBD-03 armor protection is limited by the weight restrictions necessary for air dropping. With a combat weight of 8 tonnes, the vehicle’s armor is thin and sloped to maximize resistance to small caliber weapons.

Variants
ZLC-2000 Designation for ZBD-03 prototype.
ZBD-03 Standard variant.
ZBD-03 Upgrade (2021) A mid-life upgrade unveiled in 2021. The upgrade kit includes a new communication system and antenna, new stabilized thermal optics, and new electro-optical sensor.
ZBD-03 Command Post The command and control version features a higher rear hull to accommodate staffs.
ZBD-03 ATGM Carrier Armed with the HJ-8 ATGM anti-tank guided missile.
ZBD-03 Armored Cargo Vehicle Carrying ammunition and other battlefield supplies.

Operators

 People's Liberation Army Air Force
 People's Liberation Army Air Force Airborne Corps - 180+ units as of 2021. 180 units of ZBD-03; Uncounted units of other variants.

Gallery

See also 
 List of modern armored fighting vehicles
Related development
 ZBD-04 - tracked infantry fighting vehicle developed by China
 ZBD-05 - amphibious fighting vehicle developed by China
 ZBL-08 - wheeled infantry fighting vehicle developed by China
Similar ground systems 
 BTR-D
 BMD-4

References

Tracked infantry fighting vehicles
Airborne fighting vehicles
Amphibious infantry fighting vehicles
Armoured fighting vehicles of the People's Republic of China
Military vehicles introduced in the 2000s